Ellen "Elli" Johanna Ylimaa, née Linnanheimo (1900–1982) was a Finnish stage and film actress. She was the sister of the actress Regina Linnanheimo.

Selected filmography
 Substitute Wife (1936)
 The Song of the Scarlet Flower (1938)
 Cross of Love (1946)
 Restless Blood (1946)
 Tree Without Fruit (1947)
 Gabriel, Come Back (1951)
 Two Funny Guys (1953)

References

External links 
 

1900 births
1982 deaths
Finnish stage actresses
Finnish film actresses
Actors from Turku